The MacEwan Griffins are the athletic teams that represent MacEwan University in Edmonton, Alberta, Canada. In Canadian intercollegiate competition, teams compete in U Sports. USPORTS associations oversee the Canada West Universities Athletic Association regional conferences for which the MacEwan Griffins are members.

Teams 
Across 4 varsity sports disciplines, MacEwan University fields eight teams overall. 

 Basketball (m/w)
 Ice Hockey (m/w)
 Soccer (m/w)
 Volleyball (m/w)

Facilities 

 Christenson Family Centre for Sport and Wellness (Basketball and Volleyball)
 Downtown Community Arena (Ice Hockey)
 Clarke Stadium

References

External links 

 MacEwan Griffins

MacEwan University
Sports teams in Edmonton